Diving into the Wreck: Poems 1971–1972 is an anthology of poems written by Adrienne Rich. Published in 1973, it won the National Book Award for Poetry in 1974.

Description
Diving into the Wreck: Poems 1971–1972 is Rich's seventh book of poetry, first published in 1973. It is a collection of exploratory and often angry poems, split the 1974 National Book Award for Poetry with Allen Ginsberg, The Fall of America. Rich declined to accept the award individually and was joined by the two other feminist poets nominated—Alice Walker and Audre Lorde—to accept it on behalf of all women "whose voices have gone and still go unheard in a patriarchal world."

Poems

"Diving into the Wreck"

The eponymous metaphorical poem describes a deep-sea diver before and during the exploration of a shipwreck.

"Rape"
"Rape" is a poem that describes the plight of a woman who has been raped, forced to seek justice from a callous and patronizing male-dominated world.  As in many of Rich's poems, "Rape" highlights the struggle of women against sexism and its sometimes cruel consequences, and can be seen as an effort to call women to action. "Rape" was published in 1973 in Diving into the Wreck: Poems 1971-1972.

References

External links
 Text of "Rape"

1973 poems
American poems
Poems about rape